Diplodoma is a small genus of the bagworm moth family, Psychidae. Therein, it belongs to the Taleporiinae. Some authors consider Diplodoma a junior synonym of Narycia, but this is not widely accepted.

Species of Diplodoma include:
 Diplodoma adspersella Heinemann, 1870
 Diplodoma laichartingella (Goeze, 1783) (= D. herminatum, D. marginepunctellum)
 Diplodoma taurica Zagulajev, 1986

Footnotes

References
  (2009): Diplodoma. Version 2.1, 2009-DEC-22. Retrieved 2010-MAY-02.
  (2004): Butterflies and Moths of the World, Generic Names and their Type-species – Diplodoma. Version of 2004-NOV-05. Retrieved 2010-MAY-05.
  (2001): Markku Savela's Lepidoptera and some other life forms – Diplodoma. Version of 2001-NOV-04. Retrieved 2010-MAY-03.

Psychidae
Psychidae genera